The Immenberg (also spelled Imebärg) is a mountain located between Thundorf and Stettfurt in the canton of Thurgau.

The summit forms a wooded plateau, which is traversed by several trails. On the south-west slopes of the mountain is located the Sonnenberg Castle.

References

External links
Immenberg on Hikr

Mountains of Thurgau
Mountains of Switzerland
Mountains of Switzerland under 1000 metres